Onymacris unguicularis, the head-stander beetle,  is a species of fog basking beetle that is native to the Namib Desert of southern Africa.  Native to a very arid yet very foggy region, the beetle is nicknamed the "head-stander" beetle for its habit of tipping its head downward and using its legs and the rest of its body to collect water.  Fog condenses on the beetle's body to form water droplets.  It then directs these drops towards its mouth to hydrate.

The head-stander beetle's adaptation to its extremely arid environment has inspired new technology. Kitae Pak, a student at Seoul National University of Technology, invented the Dew Bank, a water bottle that collects water from dew, similar to the beetle.

See also
Physosterna cribripes, another fog-basking Namib desert beetle
Stenocara gracilipes, another fog-basking Namib desert beetle
Toktokkies

References

Beetles of Africa
Tenebrionidae
Insects of Namibia
Beetles described in 1875